The Oregon Education Association (OEA) is the largest public education employees' union in the U.S. state of Oregon, representing 44,000 teachers and classified personnel. It has local affiliates in each of the state's 199 public school districts, and 8 community colleges. It is the state affiliate of the National Education Association.

OEA was incorporated in 1927 as a non-profit educational organization, nearly four decades before Oregon enacted the Teacher-Board Consultation Law, one of the first collective bargaining laws for teachers in the United States. OEA can trace its roots back to the Oregon State Educational Association, formed in 1858. It continues to include public educational policy and professional development programs in addition to activities more commonly associated with organized labor.

In September 2008, the union's own professional-level employees went on strike against the union as their employer, protesting their workload and benefits. The strike was resolved and the professional staff returned to work on October 13, 2008.

References

External links

Trade unions established in 1927
Politics of Oregon
National Education Association
Education trade unions
Trade unions in Oregon
Organizations based in Portland, Oregon
1927 establishments in Oregon
State wide trade unions in the United States